An ambassador is an official envoy, especially a highest ranking diplomat who represents a state and is usually accredited to another sovereign state, or to an international organization as the resident representative of their own government or sovereign or appointed for a special and often temporary diplomatic assignment. The word is also often used more liberally for persons who are known, without national appointment, to represent certain professions, activities and fields of endeavor.

Ambassadors

List of current Permanent Representatives to the United Nations

Unsorted (mostly historic)

List of ambassadors to Angola
List of Afghan ambassadors to Japan
Ambassador of Uruguay to the United States
List of Ambassadors from Guinea to the United States
List of Ambassadors from Romania to the United States
List of Ambassadors of Hungary to the United Kingdom
List of Ambassadors of Ireland to the United Kingdom
List of Ambassadors of Malaysia to Russia
List of Ambassadors of Mongolia to Russia
List of Ambassadors of Morocco to the United Kingdom
List of Ambassadors of Niger to the United States
List of Ambassadors of Poland to Russia
List of Ambassadors of Singapore to Russia
List of ambassadors to Switzerland
List of Ambassadors of the Czech Republic to Russia
List of British representatives at Aden
List of Cuban ambassadors to the United States
List of Holy Roman Empire ambassadors to England
List of Mexican ambassadors to Serbia
List of diplomats of Norway to China
List of Permanent Delegates of New Zealand to UNESCO
List of Swiss Ambassadors to Australia
Republic of Poland Ambassador to the United Kingdom

References

 *